Deleria is a village and a community of the Tyrnavos municipality. Before the 2011 local government reform it was a part of the municipality of Ampelonas. The 2011 census recorded 655 inhabitants in the village. The community of Deleria covers an area of 21.996 km2.

Population
According to the 2011 census, the population of the settlement of Deleria was 655 people, a decrease of almost 22% compared with the population of the previous census of 2001.

See also
 List of settlements in the Larissa regional unit

References

Populated places in Larissa (regional unit)
Tyrnavos